Robert Singer may refer to:

Robert Singer (producer), a producer for various films and television series, such as Cujo
Robert W. Singer (born 1947), politician in New Jersey
Robert Singer (Jewish leader) (born 1956), Jewish political leader
Robert H. Singer, molecular biologist
Bobby Singer, a fictional character on the Supernatural television series with the formal name Robert Steven Singer
Bob Singer (born 1928), animation artist
Robert (singer) (born 1964), French singer